Albert Bakaev (9 January 1964 – 5 July 2009) was a paralympic swimmer from Russia competing mainly in category S3 events.

Career 
Albert has competed at the Paralympics on five occasions, firstly in 1992 competing for the unified team then in 1996, 2000, 2004 and 2008 competing for the Russian team.  In 1992 he won a bronze in the 50m backstroke behind two Frenchmen, he also finished sixth in the 100m freestyle, eighth in the 50m freestyle final and last in his heat of the 50m breaststroke.  At the 1996 games he swam a world record in the heats of the 50m backstroke and despite swimming marginally slower in the final won the gold medal he also won a silver in the 50m freestyle behind Peruvian Jaime Eulert who set a world record he also finished fifth in the 100m freestyle. In 2000 he won a silver in the 100m freestyle, bronze in the 50m freestyle and bronze in the 50m backstroke.  Athens in 2004 would prove less profitable in terms of medals but he did win a silver in the 50m backstroke, finished fourth in the 50m freestyle and sixth in the 100m freestyle.  At his fifth games in Beijing Albert finished eighth in the 100m freestyle, sixth in the 50m backstroke, eighth in the 50m freestyle and was part of the Russian relay team that was disqualified in the heats of the 4x50m medley.

References

External links
 

1964 births
2009 deaths
Paralympic swimmers of Russia
Swimmers at the 1992 Summer Paralympics
Swimmers at the 1996 Summer Paralympics
Swimmers at the 2000 Summer Paralympics
Swimmers at the 2004 Summer Paralympics
Swimmers at the 2008 Summer Paralympics
Paralympic gold medalists for Russia
Paralympic silver medalists for Russia
Paralympic bronze medalists for Russia
Paralympic bronze medalists for the Unified Team
Russian male backstroke swimmers
Medalists at the 1992 Summer Paralympics
Medalists at the 1996 Summer Paralympics
Medalists at the 2000 Summer Paralympics
Medalists at the 2004 Summer Paralympics
Paralympic medalists in swimming
Russian male freestyle swimmers
S3-classified Paralympic swimmers